Fearless is the first studio album by Travis Ryan. Integrity Music released the album on April 10, 2012. Ryan worked with producers, Josh Auer, Dan Bailey, Brandon Collins, in the making of this album.

Critical reception

Rating the album a nine out of ten from Cross Rhythms, Lins Honeyman writes, "this impressive debut release." Roger Gelwicks, giving the album three stars at Jesus Freak Hideout, states, "Fearless does more right than wrong". Awarding the album three and a half stars by New Release Tuesday, Kelly Sheads says, "'Fearless' is a great start." Jonathan Andre, rating the album three stars for Indie Vision Music, describes, "a must-buy album for reflective worship and bold". Giving the album four stars from Louder Than the Music, Jono Davies writes, "a very elegant album". Jonathan Kemp, awarding the album an eight out of ten at The Christian Music Review Blog, states, "a topnotch album". Indicating in a 4.25 out of five review by Christian Music Zine, Joshua Andre describes, it "is one to savour".

Track listing

References

2012 debut albums